During its life TRIP Linhas Aéreas operated scheduled services to the following destinations:

 Alta Floresta – Dep. Benedito Santiago Airport
 Altamira – Altamira Airport
 Aracaju – Santa Maria Airport
 Araçatuba – Dario Guarita Airport
 Araguaína – Araguaína Airport
 Araxá – Romeu Zema Airport
 Barcelos – Barcelos Airport
 Barreiras – Barreiras Airport
 Bauru/Arealva – Moussa Nakhl Tobias Airport
 Belém – Val de Cans/Júlio Cezar Ribeiro International Airport
 Belo Horizonte
 Pampulha/Carlos Drummond de Andrade Airport
 Tancredo Neves International Airport (Confins)
 Boa Vista – Atlas Brasil Cantanhede International Airport
 Bonito – Bonito Airport
 Brasília – Pres. Juscelino Kubitschek International Airport
 Cabo Frio – Cabo Frio International Airport
 Cacoal – Capital do Café Airport
 Campina Grande – Pres. João Suassuna Airport
 Campinas – Viracopos International Airport
 Campo Grande – Campo Grande International Airport (Antonio João)
 Campos dos Goytacazes – Bartolomeu Lysandro Airport
 Carajás (Parauapebas) – Carajás Airport
 Cascavel – Adalberto Mendes da Silva Airport
 Chapecó – Serafin Enoss Bertaso Airport
 Coari – Coari Airport
 Corumbá – Corumbá International Airport
 Criciúma/Forquilhinha – Diomício Freitas Airport
 Cruzeiro do Sul – Cruzeiro do Sul International Airport
 Cuiabá/Vargem Grande  – Mal. Rondon International Airport
 Curitiba – Afonso Pena International Airport
 Diamantina – Diamantina Airport
 Dourados  – Francisco de Matos Pereira Airport
 Eirunepé – Amaury Feitosa Tomaz Airport
 Fernando de Noronha – Fernando de Noronha Airport
 Florianópolis – Hercílio Luz International Airport 
 Fonte Boa – Fonte Boa Airport
 Fortaleza - Pinto Martins International Airport
 Foz do Iguaçu – Cataratas International Airport
 Goiânia – Santa Genoveva Airport
 Governador Valadares – Cel. Altino Machado de Oliveira Airport
 Humaitá – Humaitá Airport
 Ilhéus – Ilhéus Jorge Amado Airport
 Ipatinga – Usiminas Airport
 Itaituba – Itaituba Airport
 Ji-Paraná – José Coleto Airport
 Joinville – Lauro Carneiro de Loyola Airport
 Juazeiro do Norte - Juazeiro do Norte Airport
 Juiz de Fora – Francisco Álvares de Assis Airport (Serrinha)
 Lábrea – Lábrea Airport
 Lençóis – Cel. Horácio de Mattos Airport
 Londrina – Gov. José Richa Airport 
 Macaé – Benedito Lacerda Airport
 Macapá – Alberto Alcolumbre International Airport
 Maceió – Zumbi dos Palmares International Airport
 Manaus – Eduardo Gomes International Airport
 Marabá – Marabá Airport
 Marília – Frank Miloye Milenkowichi Airport
 Maringá – Sílvio Name Júnior Regional Airport
 Montes Claros – Mário Ribeiro Airport
 Natal – Augusto Severo International Airport
 Navegantes – Ministro Victor Konder International Airport
 Palmas – Brig. Lysias Rodrigues Airport
 Parintins – Júlio Belém Airport
 Patos de Minas – Pedro Pereira dos Santos Airport
 Pelotas – Pelotas International Airport
 Petrolina – Sen. Nilo Coelho Airport
 Porto Alegre – Salgado Filho International Airport
 Porto de Trombetas (Oriximiná) – Porto Trombetas Airport
 Porto Seguro – Porto Seguro Airport
 Porto Velho – Gov. Jorge Teixeira de Oliveira International Airport
 Presidente Prudente – Presidente Prudente Airport
 Recife – Guararapes/Gilberto Freyre International Airport
 Resende – Resende Airport
 Ribeirão Preto – Leite Lopes Airport 
 Rio Branco – Plácido de Castro International Airport
 Rio de Janeiro – Santos Dumont Airport
 Rio Verde – Gal. Leite de Castro Airport
 Rondonópolis – Maestro Marinho Franco Airport
 Salvador da Bahia – Deputado Luís Eduardo Magalhães International Airport
 Santa Isabel do Rio Negro – Tapuruquara Airport
 Santa Maria – Santa Maria Airport
 Santarém – Maestro Wilson Fonseca Airport
 São Gabriel da Cachoeira – São Gabriel da Cachoeira Airport
 São João del Rei – Pref. Octávio de Almeida Neves Airport
 São José do Rio Preto – Prof. Eribelto Manoel Reino Airport
 São José dos Campos – Prof. Urbano Ernesto Stumpf Airport
 São Luís – Marechal Cunha Machado International Airport
 São Paulo/Guarulhos – Gov. André Franco Montoro International Airport (Cumbica)
 São Paulo de Olivença – Sen. Eunice Micheles Airport
 Sinop – Sinop Airport
 Tabatinga – Tabatinga International Airport
 Tefé – Tefé Airport
 Tucuruí – Tucuruí Airport
 Uberaba  – Mário de Almeida Franco Airport
 Uberlândia – Ten. Cel. Av. César Bombonato Airport 
 Varginha – Maj. Brig. Trompowsky Airport
 Vilhena – Brig. Camarão Airport
 Vitória – Eurico de Aguiar Salles Airport (Goiabeiras)
 Vitória da Conquista – Pedro Otacílio Figueiredo Airport

References

Azul Brazilian Airlines
Lists of airline destinations